A pain scale measures a patient's pain intensity or other features. Pain scales are a common communication tool in medical contexts, and are used in a variety of medical settings. Pain scales are a necessity to assist with better assessment of pain and patient screening. Pain measurements help determine the severity, type, and duration of the pain, and are used to make an accurate diagnosis, determine a treatment plan, and evaluate the effectiveness of treatment. Accurately measuring pain is a necessity in medical settings, especially if the pain measurement is going to be used as a screening tool, either for potential diseases or medical problems, or as a type of triage to determine urgency of one patient over another. Pain scales are based on trust, cartoons (behavioral), or imaginary data, and are available for neonates, infants, children, adolescents, adults, seniors, and persons whose communication is impaired. Pain assessments are often regarded as "the 5th Vital Sign".

It is important to understand what features of pain scales are most useful, least useful, and which aid in understanding. In fact, a patient's self-reported pain is so critical in the pain assessment method that it has been described as the "most valid measure" of pain. The focus on patient report of pain is an essential aspect of any pain scale, but there are additional features that should be included in a pain scale. In addition to focusing on the patient's perspective, a pain scale should also be free of bias, accurate and reliable, able to differentiate between pain and other undesired emotions, absolute not relative, and able to act as a predictor or screening tool.

Partial list of pain measurement scales 

 Alder Hey Triage Pain Score
 Behavioral Pain Scale (BPS)
 Brief Pain Inventory (BPI)
 Checklist of Nonverbal Pain Indicators (CNPI)
 Clinical Global Impression (CGI)
 COMFORT scale
 Color Scale for Pain 
 Critical-Care Pain Observation Tool (CPOT)
 Dallas Pain Questionnaire
 Descriptor differential scale (DDS)
 Dolorimeter Pain Index (DPI)
 Edmonton Symptom Assessment System
 Face Legs Activity Cry Consolability scale
 Faces Pain Scale – Revised (FPS-R)
 Global Pain Scale
 Lequesne algofunctional index: a composite measure of pain and disability, with separate self-report questionnaires for hip and knee OA (osteoarthritis):
 Original index (1987) 
 1991 revision 
 1997 revision 
 Mankoski Pain Scale
 McGill Pain Questionnaire (MPQ)
 Multiple Pain Rating Scales
 Neck Pain and Disability Scale –NPAD
 Numerical 11 point box (BS-11)
 Numeric Rating Scale (NRS-11)
 Oswestry Disability Index
 Palliative Care Outcome Scale (PCOS)
 Roland-Morris Back Pain Questionnaire
 Support Team Assessment Schedule (STAS)
 Wharton Pain and Impairment Numeric Scale (Wharton PAIN Scale)
 Wong-Baker FACES Pain Rating Scale
 Visual analog scale (VAS)

Specialized tests
 Abbey pain scale for people with end-stage dementia
 AUSCAN: Disease-Specific, to assess hand osteoarthritis outcomes.
 Colorado Behavioral Numerical Pain Scale (for sedated patients)
 CPOT For those who can't self report
 Osteoarthritis Research Society International-Outcome Measures in Rheumatoid Arthritis Clinical Trials (OARSI-OMERACT) Initiative, New OA Pain Measure: Disease-Specific, Osteoarthritis Pain
 Oucher Scale for Pediatrics
 Pain Assessment in Advanced Dementia (PAINAD)
 Pediatric Pain Questionnaire (PPQ) for measuring pain in children
 Premature Infant Pain Profile (PIPP) for measuring pain in premature infants
 Schmidt Sting Pain Index and Starr sting pain scale both for insect stings
 WOMAC : Disease-Specific, to assess knee osteoarthritis outcomes.

Numeric rating scale
The Numeric Rating Scale (NRS-11) is an 11-point scale for patient self-reporting of pain. It is based solely on the ability to perform activities of daily living (ADLs) and can be used for adults and children 10 years old or older.

Pain interferes with a person's ability to perform ADLs. Pain also interferes with a person's ability to concentrate, and to think. A sufficiently strong pain can be disabling on a person's concentration and coherent thought, even though it is not strong enough to prevent that person's performance of ADLs. However, there is no system available for measuring concentration and thought.

In endometriosis
The most common pain scale for quantification of endometriosis-related pain is the visual analogue scale (VAS). A review came to the conclusion that VAS and numerical rating scale (NRS) were the best adapted pain scales for pain measurement in endometriosis. For research purposes, and for more detailed pain measurement in clinical practice, the review suggested use of VAS or NRS for each type of typical pain related to endometriosis (dysmenorrhea, deep dyspareunia and non-menstrual chronic pelvic pain), combined with the clinical global impression (CGI) and a quality of life scale.

See also
 SOCRATES (pain assessment)
 Pain management in children

Notes

 
Pain